Céltiga Fútbol Club is a Spanish football team based in A Illa de Arousa in the autonomous community of Galicia. Founded in 1967, it plays in Tercera División – Group 1. Its stadium is Estadio Salvador Otero with a capacity of 2,000 seats.

Season to season

14 seasons in Tercera División

References

External links
Official website

Football clubs in Galicia (Spain)
Association football clubs established in 1967
1967 establishments in Spain